Mauricio Roberto Pochettino Trossero (born 2 March 1972) is an Argentine professional football manager and former player. He was most recently the head coach of Ligue 1 club Paris Saint-Germain.

Pochettino played as a central defender and began his career in 1989 with Primera División club Newell's Old Boys, winning a league title and finishing as runner-up in the 1992 Copa Libertadores. In 1994, he transferred to newly promoted La Liga club Espanyol, helping establish their top-flight status and won the 2000 Copa del Rey, their first trophy in 60 years. In 2001, he joined Ligue 1 club Paris Saint-Germain, and had a stint with Bordeaux, before returning to Espanyol in 2004, winning another Copa del Rey in 2006. Pochettino was capped 20 times for the Argentina national team and played at the 1999 Copa América and 2002 FIFA World Cup.

After retiring as a player, Pochettino began his managerial career at Espanyol in 2009. He left the club in 2012 after poor results and financial disputes. In 2013, he was appointed at Premier League club Southampton, leading them to an eighth-place finish that season – equalling their highest ever Premier League finish. He signed for Tottenham Hotspur in 2014 and finished as league runner-up in the 2016–17 season and UEFA Champions League finalist in 2019. He was dismissed after a string of poor results, and in 2021, joined Paris Saint-Germain, where he won Ligue 1 and the Coupe de France.

Early life
Pochettino was born in Murphy, Santa Fe to Amalia and Héctor Pochettino, a farm labourer. His family is of Italian descent from Piedmont. Between the age of eight and ten, he played both football and volleyball, and also learned judo. He supported Racing Club de Avellaneda as a child. The first football match he watched on television was the 1978 FIFA World Cup which he watched with his father Héctor at the local sports club in Murphy, Centro Recreativo Unión y Cultura. He started playing as a centre-back at an early age for Unión y Cultura, a position he preferred, but he also played as a striker and midfielder. When he was 13, he trained two days a week with Rosario Central in Rosario, Santa Fe, a 160-mile bus-ride away from Murphy. He played in Murphy in the first division of the regional Venadense league together with his older brother, Javier. He studied agriculture in a school 20 miles from home.

Club career

Newell's Old Boys

When he was 14, Pochettino was scouted by Jorge Griffa, director of football at Newell's Old Boys, and his future manager Marcelo Bielsa, then the reserve team coach at Newell's. Although he was happy at Rosario Central who were interested in signing him, he was persuaded to try out for their rivals Newell's Old Boys in Rosario, Santa Fe. He was quickly placed in a team attending a tournament in Mar del Plata in January 1987, and helped the team win 3–2 in the final against Club Olimpia of Paraguay, after which he signed for Newell's. He was offered a professional contract at 16, and made his first appearance in the Primera División in the 1988–89 season when he was 17.

At Newell's he played in an intense, fast-paced, high press style of play under Bielsa who was first-team coach from 1990 to 1992. Bielsa's coaching methods and philosophy would have a significant impact on the young player.

During his five-year stint at the club, Pochettino won the 1990–91 national championship as well as the 1992 Clausura. The side also reached the final of the Copa Libertadores helped by Pochettino who netted a crucial goal away to Colombian champions América de Cali in the second match leg of their semi-final, but they were beaten 3–2 in the final in a penalty shoot-out by São Paulo after both teams drew 1–1 on aggregate over the course of two legs. He played with Diego Maradona for a time, sharing a room before games.

Espanyol
In 1994, Pochettino had the option of joining a number of clubs including Boca Juniors, but chose the Catalan club Espanyol even though it was the least financially attractive offer as he was interested in moving to the city of Barcelona. Aged 22, Pochettino moved to Espanyol for the 1994–95 season, as part of the new intake of players upon their return to La Liga. There he soon established himself as an automatic first-team starter, and developed a reputation as a tough, uncompromising central defender. In February 1997, in the local derby against their rival Barcelona at the soon-to-be-demolished home ground Sarrià Stadium, Pochettino man-marked Ronaldo out the game, and helped the team win 2–0. It was their first win against Barcelona in ten years.

He stayed six-and-a-half years at the club. Although he had the opportunity to move a number of occasions, he chose to stay. In 1998 he stayed so as to reconnect with his former coach Bielsa, and he also rejected an offer from Valencia in the 1999–2000 season out of loyalty to the club. In that season, he helped Espanyol beat Atlético Madrid in the 2000 final of the Copa del Rey, winning their first major trophy in 60 years.

In the 1999–2000 season, he signed a pre-agreement to stay at the club for 6 more years contingent on funding. However, the club could not finance the deal, and informed Pochettino that he should accept an offer from Paris Saint-Germain.

Paris-Saint Germain
In late January 2001, Pochettino signed for Paris Saint-Germain for an undisclosed fee. A regular starter during his stay, he made his official league debut on 3 February 2001 for manager Luis Fernández away to Nantes, which PSG lost 1–0. Three days later, Pochettino netted his first goal in a 1–3 home defeat at the Parc des Princes against Guingamp. His contributions led to Paris Saint-Germain winning the 2001 edition of the UEFA Intertoto Cup later in the 2001–02 season following a 1–1 draw with Brescia, which meant the Parisian side won on away goals, as well as reaching the final of the Coupe de France the next season, where PSG lost 1–2 to Auxerre.

Bordeaux
In July, 2003, Pochettino moved to fellow Ligue 1 outfit Bordeaux for the 2003–04 campaign. His first game came on 2 August 2003 against Monaco in a 2–0 defeat. Pochettino's first goal was on 23 August, thus helping Bordeaux overcome Auxerre with a 2–0 home victory.

Return to Espanyol
During the 2004 summer transfer window, he returned to Espanyol however, initially on loan, before he later made the transfer permanent. The return occurred midway through his first year, where Pochettino continued to play for two-and-a-half more seasons. In the 2005–06 Copa del Rey, he was an unused substitute at the final, where Espanyol beat Zaragoza 4–1.

Following the win, Ernesto Valverde took over as manager in the summer of 2006, but he did not want Pochettino in the squad for the coming season. Pochettino announced his retirement as a player at the age of 34. He studied for a master's degree in sports management at a business school before training to be a coach in Madrid a year later.

International career
In 1992, Pochettino played four matches for the Argentina under-23 team at the CONMEBOL Pre-Olympic Tournament in Paraguay, which saw them fail to qualify for the 1992 Summer Olympics.

Pochettino won 20 caps for the full side over a period of four years. He was handed his first senior international by his former manager Bielsa, playing his first match on 31 March 1999 in a friendly against the Netherlands at Amsterdam Arena, ending in a 1–1 draw. Pochettino scored his first goal on 17 November 1999 in another friendly, a 2–0 win over Spain. He was a participant at the 1999 Copa América and the 2002 FIFA World Cup under Bielsa, appearing in three complete matches as the nation were unsuccessful in progressing from the group stage in the latter tournament.

Pochettino's most newsworthy highlight to the competition came during the second group stage match against England, when Italian referee Pierluigi Collina awarded Argentina's opponents a penalty, after the defender brought down Michael Owen in the box. The resulting kick was converted by David Beckham for the match's only goal.

Managerial career

Espanyol

In late January 2009, Pochettino became Espanyol's third coach of the 2008–09 season, with the team third from the bottom of the table. Tasked with saving them from relegation, he had only just received his UEFA Pro License in December 2008 and had spent a short spell as the assistant coach to the ladies' team but was otherwise untested as a coach. His first match was at home to neighbouring FC Barcelona, coached by Pep Guardiola, in the quarter-finals of the Copa del Rey. Despite his players' reluctance and only being able to avail themselves of two training sessions prior to the game, his system of high pressing and one-on-one defensive cover yielded an unexpected 0–0 draw. After he had asked for "divine intervention", the side's fortunes improved and they eventually finished the season comfortably mid-table with their most significant result being a 2–1 victory in the league derby against Barcelona, their first in the competition at the Camp Nou for 27 years. He coached nine players who were his teammates during his last year active and, in early June, renewed his contract for a further three years.

In 2009–10, Pochettino once again led Espanyol to a comfortable league position, in a campaign where club captain (and his former teammate) Raúl Tamudo fell out of favour, particularly after the January 2010 arrival of the coach's compatriot Dani Osvaldo. On 28 September 2010, he agreed to a one-year extension at the Estadi Cornellà-El Prat which ran until 30 June 2012, and in May of the following year further renewed his contract until 2014. On 26 November 2012, however, following a 0–2 home loss against Getafe CF that left the team in last place with just nine points from 13 matches and with the manager complaining about the financial restrictions being placed upon him, his contract was terminated by mutual consent at the end of that month.

Despite the lowly league position, Pochettino's work had drawn praise from commentators and he was beginning to display the characteristics that would inform his coaching at his subsequent clubs, namely the imposition of a specific tactical style on all of the clubs' team from the senior side down to youth level, attending training sessions to receive updates from all levels, a preference for 4–2–3–1, a focus on a high-pressing game and the promotion of players from the academy to the first team.

Southampton
On 18 January 2013, Pochettino was announced as the new first-team manager of Premier League club Southampton, replacing Nigel Adkins and becoming the second Argentine manager in English football after Osvaldo Ardiles. His first match in charge was five days later, a 0–0 draw against Everton at St Mary's Stadium. He recorded his first win on 9 February, 3–1 at home over reigning champions Manchester City.

Despite having some knowledge of English, Pochettino initially used a Spanish interpreter in press conferences as a way to fully express himself. He led the Saints to notable victories against other top league sides, including a 3–1 home win over Liverpool and a 2–1 success against Chelsea also at St Mary's.

In his first full season at Southampton, Pochettino led the team to an eighth-placed finish, their highest league position since 2002–03, while also recording their highest points tally since the Premier League began in 1992–93.

Tottenham Hotspur
On 27 May 2014, Pochettino was appointed head coach of Tottenham Hotspur on a five-year contract, becoming their tenth manager over a 12-year span. The following 28 January, the team reached the final of the League Cup following a 3–2 aggregate win over Sheffield United, only to be beaten 2–0 by Chelsea in the decisive game at Wembley Stadium. In the domestic league, his first season was generally successful, ending in a fifth-placed finish and the conversion of several young academy players into regular first-team players; he put one of those graduates, Harry Kane, as starting striker at the expense of Spanish international Roberto Soldado, a gamble which paid off as Kane and his teammates Dele Alli and Eric Dier were touted as the potential basis for the England squad at UEFA Euro 2016.

Tottenham were in contention to win the league in 2015–16, but on 2 May 2016 they drew 2–2 against Chelsea, confirming Leicester City as champions. The game at Stamford Bridge saw the former receive a league record nine yellow cards, and Pochettino entered the pitch in the first half to separate his left back Danny Rose from a confrontation with Chelsea winger Willian. Spurs also lost in their last match of the season, ceding the league runners-up spot to rival Arsenal – it was still good enough for their highest league finish since 1990.

On 12 May 2016, Pochettino agreed to an extension to his contract, committing him to the club until 2021 as it was also confirmed that his title had changed from that of "head coach" to "manager", although he confirmed that the role itself was no different. The campaign began with a series of 12 unbeaten league matches that ended with a defeat away to Chelsea in late November. However, inconsistencies which saw them being eliminated from UEFA Champions League and League Cup contention meant that they fell some way behind the leaders Chelsea who had a run of 13 wins (ended by a loss to Tottenham in January 2017).

Pochettino's side eventually finished in second place with 86 points, their highest-ever tally since the English League began under the new denomination and their highest ranking in 54 years since 1962–63 under Bill Nicholson, and the first season-long unbeaten home run in 52 years since 1964–65 was also achieved.

On 24 May 2018, Pochettino signed a new five-year contract to keep him at Tottenham until 2023. In December 2018, Pochettino won his 100th Premier League match as manager of Tottenham after a late win against Burnley; he became the first Tottenham manager to reach this milestone and the third quickest Premier League manager to achieve the feat with a single club. On 8 May 2019, Pochettino led Tottenham to their first ever Champions League/European Cup final after beating Ajax on away goals (3–3 aggregate), with his side coming back from a 2–0 deficit (3–0 aggregate) at half-time in Amsterdam, only for Lucas Moura to score a second-half hat-trick. The final in Madrid ended in a 2–0 defeat to Liverpool.

On 19 November 2019, Pochettino was dismissed by Tottenham Hotspur with the side placed 14th in the Premier League table, with chairman Daniel Levy citing "extremely disappointing" domestic results as the reason behind the dismissal. Pochettino was succeeded by José Mourinho.

Paris Saint-Germain
On 2 January 2021, Pochettino was appointed as the head coach of Paris Saint-Germain on an 18-month contract, where he had spent two years during his playing career. He replaced Thomas Tuchel. His first match in charge was four days later, a 1–1 away league draw against Saint-Étienne. On 9 January, Pochettino won his first game in a 3–0 home win over Brest. Four days later, he won the first honour of his managerial career as Paris Saint-Germain defeated rivals Marseille with a 2–1 victory in the Trophée des Champions. On 16 February 2021, Pochettino took charge of his first Champions League match with the Parisians, guiding them to a 4–1 win over Barcelona at the Camp Nou in the first leg of the round of 16 tie. This marked Pochettino's first European victory as Paris Saint-Germain coach. In the Champions League quarter-finals, PSG won against the title holders Bayern Munich on the away goal rule, due to a 3–2 away victory at the Allianz Arena. However, PSG lost in both legs in the semi-finals against Manchester City. Pochettino finished the season with a win in the Coupe de France Final against Monaco, and in second place in the Ligue 1 behind Lille. In July 2021, he extended his contract until 2023. In the 2021–22 season, he won his first Ligue 1 title. On 5 July 2022, it was announced that Paris Saint-Germain had parted ways with Pochettino.

Style of coaching

Pochettino favours a very high-pressing, attacking style of football. He often employs a 4–2–3–1 formation at the clubs he manages. While doing so, he instructs his team to build from the back, intimidate and unsettle opponents with a quick-press system and work the ball into the box.

Pochettino is hailed by many pundits for his focus on developing local players from the clubs' youth academies, getting local government and references' support, and a willingness to promote young players in general. It was also noted that many young players under his tutelage went on to play for the England national team, while the manager himself felt that it was his duty to develop English talent, saying "I feel when I arrived in Spain and now in England in which way can we say 'thank you' to the country that opened the door when I didn't speak English. And how people treated me and my family and my staff which was really well. It's a way to say thank you to the Premier League and the people who trust in you".

Players coached by Pochettino also praised his man-management approach and guidance with his willingness to advise, encouraging the players to take charge of their own development as well as helping them to improve physically, technically and mentally.

Personal life
Pochettino and his wife Karina Grippaldi have two sons, Sebastiano and Maurizio. Sebastiano was Tottenham's first team sports scientist. Maurizio was granted a contract with Tottenham's development squad, scoring his first goal for the under-18 side against Norwich City in October 2018. In early December, he made his debut for the under-23s against VfL Wolfsburg. In January 2021, Maurizio signed for Watford.

Pochettino believes in "energía universal", the idea that people, places and things are charged with a hidden energy, positive or negative. "I believe in energía universal", he said. "It is connected. Nothing happens for causality (By accident). It is always a consequence [of something else]. Maybe, it is one of the reasons that Harry [Kane] always scores in derbies. I believe in that energy. For me, it exists".

Career statistics

Club

International

Argentina score listed first, score column indicates score after each Pochettino goal.

Managerial statistics

Honours

Player
Newell's Old Boys
Primera División: 1990–91, Clausura 1992
Copa Libertadores runner-up: 1992

Espanyol
Copa del Rey: 1999–2000, 2005–06

Paris Saint-Germain
UEFA Intertoto Cup: 2001
Coupe de France runner-up: 2002–03

Manager
Tottenham Hotspur
Football League Cup runner-up: 2014–15
UEFA Champions League runner-up: 2018–19

Paris Saint-Germain
Ligue 1: 2021–22
Coupe de France: 2020–21
Trophée des Champions: 2020

Individual
Premier League Manager of the Month: October 2013, September 2015, February 2016, April 2017
London Football Awards Manager of the Year: 2018–19

References

Bibliography

External links

1972 births
Living people
People from General López Department
Argentine sportspeople of Italian descent
People of Piedmontese descent
Argentine footballers
Association football defenders
Newell's Old Boys footballers
RCD Espanyol footballers
Paris Saint-Germain F.C. players
FC Girondins de Bordeaux players
Argentine Primera División players
La Liga players
Ligue 1 players
Argentina youth international footballers
Argentina international footballers
1999 Copa América players
2002 FIFA World Cup players
Argentine expatriate footballers
Argentine expatriate sportspeople in Spain
Expatriate footballers in Spain
Expatriate footballers in France
Argentine football managers
RCD Espanyol managers
Southampton F.C. managers
Tottenham Hotspur F.C. managers
Paris Saint-Germain F.C. managers
La Liga managers
Premier League managers
Ligue 1 managers
Argentine expatriate football managers
Argentine expatriate sportspeople in England
Expatriate football managers in Spain
Expatriate football managers in England
Expatriate football managers in France
Sportspeople from Santa Fe Province